Robert Allbritton (born February 16, 1969) is the owner and founder of Capitol News Company, the parent company of Capitol Hill political newspaper and website Politico.

Allbritton also served as the chairman and CEO of Allbritton Communications, which owned several ABC-affiliated television stations in Washington, D.C. Allbritton was previously the final CEO of Riggs National Corporation, the parent of Riggs Bank, from 2001 to 2005, when PNC Bank acquired the bank. Allbritton has been described by The New Republic as having "reshaped the way we follow politics." He is a trustee of the Lyndon Baines Johnson Library and Museum.

In October 2011, Allbritton was included on The New Republics list of Washington's most powerful, least famous people.

Allbritton received his Bachelor of Arts degree from Wesleyan University in 1992, and has served as a member of its board of trustees. With his wife Elena, Allbritton donated funds for the establishment of the school's Allbritton Center for the Study of Public Life.

Allbritton is the son of the late banker and businessman Joe Allbritton.

References

American bank presidents
American newspaper publishers (people)
Living people
Wesleyan University alumni
1969 births